Ramsar (also Romanized as Rámsar and Ránsar; formerly, Sakht Sar) is the capital of Ramsar County, Mazandaran Province, Iran. In 2012 its population was 33,018, in 9,421 families.

Ramsar lies on the coast of the Caspian Sea. It was also known as Sakhtsar in the past. The climate of Ramsar is hot and humid in summer and mild in winter. The proximity of the forest and the sea in this city has given a special beauty to this city and this attracts tourists in all seasons. Ramsar has an airport. The city of Ramsar was a small village in western Mazandaran until the Qajar period, and during the first Pahlavi period, with the rule of Reza Shah and with the support of the government, it became a beautiful city with many tourist facilities.

Ramsar is the westernmost county and city in Mazandaran. It borders the Caspian Sea to the north, Gilan province to the west, Qazvin Province to the south, and Tonekabon to the east.

People
The Gilaks form the majority of the cities population. Their dialect of Gilaki is similar to that found in eastern Gilan and belongs to the Eastern or Bie-Pish branch.

History
In 1971, Ramsar hosted the Ramsar Convention on Wetlands of International Importance.

Tourism

Ramsar is a popular sea resort for Iranian tourists.

Ramsar Convention
The Convention on Wetlands, signed in Ramsar in 1971, is an intergovernmental treaty which provides the framework for national action and international cooperation for the conservation and wise use of wetlands and their resources. There are presently 160 contracting parties to the convention, with 1920 wetland sites, totaling , designated for inclusion in the Ramsar List of Wetlands of International Importance. 
Presently, there are 160 contracting parties, up from 119 in 2000 and from 18 initial signatory nations in 1971. Signatories meet every three years as the Conference of the Contracting Parties (COP), the first held in Cagliari, Italy, in 1980. Amendments to the original convention have been agreed to in Paris (in 1982) and Regina, Canada (in 1987).

Climate
Ramsar has a humid subtropical climate (Köppen: Cfa, Trewartha: Cf), with warm, humid summers and cool, damp winters.
Northern Iran, as well as most portions of Iran, is separated by mountains. As a result, the air in Teheran is very dry. When driving to Ramsar from Teheran, one drives up the mountains until arriving  at a tunnel. On passing through this tunnel and coming out the other side, the environment is very different; it is more humid and green due to moisture from the Caspian sea, and this abundance of mist and rain is part of the attraction for tourists from the desert zones of Iran.

Radioactivity

Ramsar's Talesh Mahalleh district is the most radioactive inhabited area known on Earth, due to nearby hot springs and building materials originating from them. A combined population of 2,000 residents from this district and other high radiation neighborhoods receive an average radiation dose of 10 mSv per year, ten times more than the ICRP-recommended limit for exposure to the public from artificial sources. Record levels were found in a house where the effective radiation dose due to external radiation was 131 mSv/a, and the committed dose from radon was 72 mSv/a. This unique case is over 80 times higher than the world average background radiation.

The prevailing model of radiation-induced cancer posits that the risk rises linearly with dose at a rate of 5% per Sv.  If this linear no-threshold model is correct, it should be possible to observe an increased incidence of cancer in Ramsar through careful long-term studies currently underway. Early anecdotal evidence from local doctors and preliminary cytogenetic studies suggested that there may be no such harmful effect, and possibly even a radio-adaptive effect. More recent epidemiological data show a slightly reduced lung cancer rate and non-significantly elevated morbidity, but the small size of the population (only 1800 inhabitants in the high-background areas) will require a longer monitoring period to draw definitive conclusions. Furthermore, there are questions regarding possible non-cancer effects of the radiation background. An Iranian study has shown that people in the area have a significantly higher expression of CD69 gene and also a higher incidence of stable and unstable chromosomal aberrations. Chromosomal aberrations have been found in other studies.

Radiation hormesis was observed in a study that also recommended that Ramsar does provide justification to relax existing regulatory dose limits. Pending further study, the potential health risks had moved scientists in 2001–02 to call for relocation of the residents and regulatory control of new construction.

The radioactivity is due to the local geology. Underground water dissolves radium in uraniferous igneous rock and carries it to the surface through at least nine known hot springs. These are used as spas by locals and tourists. Some of the radium precipitates into travertine, a form of limestone, and the rest diffuses into the soil, where it is absorbed by crops and mixes with drinking water. Residents have unknowingly used the radioactive limestone as a building material for their homes. The stone irradiates the inhabitants and generates radon gas which is usually seen to promote lung cancer. Crops contribute 72 µSv/yr to a critical group of 50 residents.

International relations

Twin towns and sister cities
Ramsar is twinned with:
 Puerto Montt, Chile (Since 28 January 2009)
 Al Wakrah, Qatar (Since 14 June 2010)
 Shiraz, Iran (Since 9 January 2013)

Notable people
 Mohammad Reza Khalatbari (b. 1983) - Football player
 Esfandiar Rahim Mashaei (b. 1960) - Politician
 Hossein Khalatbari (1949-1985) - Iranian fighter pilot
 Elika Abdolrazzaghi (b. 1979) - Cinema, stage and TV actress
 Mohammad-Ali Taskhiri (1948-2020) - Iranian cleric and diplomat
 Rahim Ebadi (b. 1957) - Politician

Gallery

See also

 Rejuvenation (aging)
 Background radiation
 Banana equivalent dose
 History of Iran
 Tourism in Iran
 International rankings of Iran

References

External links

 Ramsar's tourism
 Ramsar's radioactivity
 Photos of Ramsar (Permission to use and copy these photos is hereby granted provided the above copyright notice appears in all the copies and modified versions of photos.)

 
Cities in Mazandaran Province
Populated coastal places in Iran
Populated places on the Caspian Sea